The East Asia Cup can refer to:

 Twenty20 East Asia Cup, a cricket tournament
 EAFF E-1 Football Championship, a football tournament